Ojaküla is a village in Paide Parish, Järva County in northern-central Estonia.

References
 

Villages in Järva County
Governorate of Estonia